Rob Lutes (born 1968) is a Canadian folk and blues musician, who has performed both as a solo artist and with the band Sussex. He is most noted for his 2017 album Walk in the Dark, for which he won the Canadian Folk Music Award for Contemporary Singer of the Year at the 14th Canadian Folk Music Awards in 2018.

Born in Toronto, Ontario and raised in Rothesay, New Brunswick, he is currently based in Montreal, Quebec.

Lutes released his debut album Gravity in 2000, and has since released five further solo albums, one album with Sussex, and one album as a duo with guitarist Rob MacDonald. He received his first CFMA nomination at the 5th Canadian Folk Music Awards in 2009, for Truth & Fiction in the English Songwriter of the Year category.

DiscographyGravity (2000)Middle Ground (2002)Ride the Shadows (2006)Truth & Fiction (2008)Rob Lutes and Rob MacDonald Live (2011)The Bravest Birds (2013)Parade Day (2016, with Sussex)Walk in the Dark (2017)Come Around'' (2021)

References

External links

1968 births
Living people
Canadian folk singer-songwriters
Canadian male singer-songwriters
Canadian blues singers
Canadian folk guitarists
Canadian blues guitarists
Musicians from Toronto
Singers from Montreal
Musicians from New Brunswick
People from Kings County, New Brunswick
Canadian male guitarists
Canadian Folk Music Award winners
21st-century Canadian male singers